Alphonsea hortensis is a species of plant in the Annonaceae family. It is endemic to Sri Lanka. The plant is extinct in wild, where it can be only found in Peradeniya royal botanical garden.

References

hortensis
Flora of Sri Lanka